Clavelina moluccensis, common name bluebell tunicate, blue bell tunicate, or blue sea squirt 
is a species of tunicate (sea squirt), in the genus Clavelina (the "little bottles"). Like all ascidians, these sessile animals are filter feeders.

Description
This species is 0.5-2.5 cm long, and light to medium blue in colour. The top of the zooids contain characteristic dark blue patches and spots that are always visible.

Distribution
This species is found in the waters around Australia, Western Pacific, Indonesia, Papua New Guinea, Mariana Islands, Philippines, Singapore, and Malaysia.

Habitat
This species grows in clusters attached to dead coral or other hard substrates, normally under overhangs.

References

External links
Clavelina moluccensis at WoRMS
Video of Clavelina moluccensis moving in current
High resolution image at NOAA

Enterogona
Animals described in 1904